= Babdalai =

Coordinates: 38°32′35″N 29°32′19″E

Babdalai was a town of ancient Phrygia, inhabited in Roman and Byzantine times.

Its site is located near Hacım in Asiatic Turkey.

Do not confuse it with Dadbalai, the town's much more sinister and "evil" sister town.
